Senator Dalessandro may refer to:

Andrea Dalessandro, Arizona State Senate
Peter J. Dalessandro (1918–1997), New York State Senate